The United States Marine Corps Forces Central Command is headquartered at MacDill Air Force Base in Tampa, Florida.
The Commander, U.S. Marine Corps Forces, Central Command (COMUSMARCENT), is designated as the Marine Corps service component commander for Commander, U.S. Central Command (COMUSCENTCOM). MARCENT is responsible for all Marine Corps Forces in the CENTCOM Area of Responsibility (AOR), except for those assigned to the U.S. Special Operations Command (USSOCOM), and Special Operations Command, Central Command (SOCCENT).

The Arabian Sea, Red Sea, Persian Gulf, and part of the Indian Ocean are included in this region. Three of the world's major religions, Christianity, Judaism and Islam have their roots here. The region contains the major maritime trade routes which link the Middle East, Europe, Asia and the Western Hemisphere. Petroleum products which fuel the economies of European and Asian allies pass through three maritime choke points in the region: the Strait of Hormuz, the Suez Canal and the Bab El Mandab.

COMUSMARCENT provides Marine Expeditionary Forces capable of conducting a wide range of operations, offering the command a responsive and unique set of capabilities. Marines embarked aboard U.S. Navy amphibious ships deploy regularly to the region, organized as Marine Air Ground Task Forces (MAGTF). These forces provide a potent mix of capabilities that can project combat power rapidly to any location in the region. While afloat in the CENTCOM AOR, they serve as a visible deterrent force, train continuously, and participate in a wide range of engagement activities.

In addition to providing MAGTFs deployed aboard U.S. Navy ships, MARCENT has the proven capability to deploy MAGTFs to the CENTCOM AOR by air and marry-up with prepositioned equipment. This provides COMUSCENTCOM with a rapid response capability across the range of military operations. Though there have been Marines stationed at CENTCOM Headquarters since September 1982, MARCENT, as a service component command, did not come into existence until 1990, when Marine Corps forces were preparing for Operations DESERT SHIELD and DESERT STORM in Southwest Asia. Beginning in 2001, under the command of Commander, Marine Corps Forces Pacific, MARCENT participated in multiple operations, including Operation ENDURING FREEDOM in Afghanistan and Pakistan, operations in the Central Asian States as well as the Horn of Africa, and Operation IRAQI FREEDOM.

On 3 August 2005, Headquarters Marine Corps designated MARCENT as a force headquarters, under the command of Commanding General, I Marine Expeditionary Force.

List of commanders

References

External links

Commands of the United States Marine Corps
Organizations based in Tampa, Florida
Military installations in Florida